Calcium/calmodulin-dependent protein kinase type II delta chain is an enzyme that in humans is encoded by the CAMK2D gene.

The product of this gene belongs to the serine/threonine protein kinase family and to the Ca2+/calmodulin-dependent protein kinase subfamily. Calcium signaling is crucial for several aspects of plasticity at glutamatergic synapses. In mammalian cells, the enzyme is composed of four different chains: alpha, beta, gamma, and delta. The product of this gene is a delta chain. Four alternatively spliced transcript variants that encode three different isoforms have been characterized to date. Distinct isoforms of this chain have different expression patterns.

References

Further reading

External links
 

EC 2.7.11